Pennterra is a Georgian farmhouse near Thurmont, Maryland.  The house is notable for its locally quarried stonework and its unusually fine proportions. The house was built at about the same time as nearby Strawberry Hill, which was built in 1783.

It was listed on the National Register of Historic Places in 1976.

References

External links
, including 1975 photo, at Maryland Historical Trust

Houses on the National Register of Historic Places in Maryland
Georgian architecture in Maryland
Houses completed in 1783
Houses in Frederick County, Maryland
National Register of Historic Places in Frederick County, Maryland
1783 establishments in Maryland